The Shumagin Islands (Unangan: Qagiiĝun) are a group of 20 islands in the Aleutians East Borough south of the mainland of Alaska, United States, at 
54°54'–55°20' North 159°15'–160°45' West.  The largest islands are Unga Island, Popof Island, Korovin Island, and Nagai Island. Other islands include Andronica, Big Koniuji, Little Koniuji, Simeonof, Chernabura, and Bird. The total land area is 1,192.369 km2 (460.376 sq mi) and their total population as of the 2020 census was 578 persons, almost entirely in the city of Sand Point, on Popof Island.

The Shumagin Islands were named after Nikita Shumagin, one of the sailors on Vitus Bering's 1741 expedition to North America who died of scurvy and was buried on Nagai Island.

References
Shumagin Islands: Block Group 3, Census Tract 1, Aleutians East Borough, Alaska United States Census Bureau

External links
South Unimak and Shumagin Islands June fisheries salmon management plan, 2007 / by Aaron D. Poetter. Hosted by the Alaska State Publications Program.

 
Islands of the Pacific Ocean
Islands of Aleutians East Borough, Alaska